Erythrolamprus typhlus, the blind ground snake,  is a species of snake in the family Colubridae. The species is found in Colombia, Venezuela, Guyana, Suriname, French Guiana,.Brazil, Peru, Ecuador, Paraguay, and Bolivia.

References

Erythrolamprus
Reptiles described in 1758
Taxa named by Carl Linnaeus